Antony Francis Campbell SJ (24 August 1934 – 2 August 2020) was a Jesuit priest and an Old Testament scholar. He was born in Christchurch,  New Zealand and educated at St Patrick's College, Silverstream. Soon after leaving school he entered the Jesuits and studied at the University of Melbourne, the Faculty of Theology at Lyon-Fourvière, the Pontifical Biblical Institute, and Claremont Graduate School. For 40 years, he taught at the United Faculty of Theology in Melbourne.

Campbell specialised in the Book of Samuel: his works include a study on the ark narrative (The Ark Narrative (1 Sam 4-6; 2 Sam 6): A Form-critical and Traditio-historical Study, 1975), and commentaries on both 1 Samuel and 2 Samuel. His 1986 book Of Prophets and Kings: A Late Ninth-Century Document (1 Samuel 1-2 Kings 10) contains the "most comprehensive examination so far" of pre-Deuteronomistic composition in Samuel and Kings.

References

1934 births
2020 deaths
Old Testament scholars
Australian biblical scholars
New Zealand Jesuits
People educated at St. Patrick's College, Silverstream
Australian Jesuits
University of Melbourne alumni
Pontifical Biblical Institute alumni
Claremont Graduate University alumni
Bible commentators
People from Christchurch
New Zealand emigrants to Australia
[